MHC Štart Nové Zámky is a handball club from Nové Zámky, Slovakia, that plays in the Niké Handball Extraliga.

Crest, colours, supporters

Club crest

Kit manufacturers

Kits

Sports Hall information

Name: – Športová hala Milénium
City: – Nové Zámky
Capacity: – 1194
Address: – Jiráskova ul. 25, 940 01 Nové Zámky, Slovakia

Management

Team

Current squad 

Squad for the 2022–23 season

Technical staff
 Head coach:  Ján Kolesár
 Assistant coach:  Atilla Oros
 Physiotherapist:  Marián Tašký
 Club doctor:  Dr. Anton Vojna

Transfers

Transfers for the 2022–23 season

Joining 

Leaving

Previous Squads

Former club members

Notable former players

  Oliver Rábek (2005–2012)
  Martin Straňovský (2001–2005)
  Tomáš Straňovský (1998–2001, 2011–2021)

References

External links
 
 

Slovak handball clubs
Sport in Nitra Region